Kagoshima Women's Junior College or  is a private women's junior college in Kagoshima, Kagoshima, Japan, established in 1965.

External links
 Official website  
 Official website 

Japanese junior colleges
Educational institutions established in 1965
Private universities and colleges in Japan
Universities and colleges in Kagoshima Prefecture
1965 establishments in Japan